The Hkakabo Razi tube-nosed bat (Murina hkakaboraziensis), also known colloquially as the Lance Bass bat is a species of vesper bat in the family Vespertilionidae. It is found only in Myanmar. The bat earned its nickname due to its spiky blonde pelage, which reminded people of Lance Bass, a member of the boy band NSYNC.

References

Murininae
Mammals described in 2017
Bats of Asia